The International Paralympic Committee recognises the fastest performances in athletics events at the Paralympic Games. Athletics has been part of every Summer Paralympic Games.

In Paralympic athletics competitions, athletes are given a class depending on the type and extent of their disability. The classes are as follows:
 11–13: Blind and visually impaired
 20: Intellectually disabled
 32–38: Athletes with cerebral palsy; classes 32–34 compete in wheelchairs, while 35–38 are ambulant
 40–46: Ambulant athletes with amputations or other disabilities such as dwarfism
 51–58: Wheelchair athletes with spinal cord injuries or amputations

Men's 
Key:

100 m

200 m

400 m

800 m

1500 m

5000 m

10000 m





High Jump

Long Jump

Triple Jump

Shot Put

Discus Throw

Javelin

Club throw

Pentathlon

Women's

100 m

200 m

400 m

800 m

1500 m

5000 m

10000 m



High Jump

Long Jump

Shot Put

Discus Throw

Javelin

Club Throw

Pentathlon

References

Athletics records
Athletics